Trần Thị Hương Giang (born 14 January 1987 in Hải Dương) is a Vietnamese beauty queen and fashion model. She used crowned Miss Hai Duong 2006 and the second runner-up Miss Vietnam Global 2009. Hương Giang was the official representative of Vietnam in the Miss World 2009 pageant in South Africa where she placed in the Top 16. In 2010, GlobalBeauties.com named her was Miss Grand Slam Asia 2009.

Background
Hương Giang studied journalism at university and is a professional model. She is the second runner-up of Miss Global Vietnam 2009, finalist top 10 in Miss Vietnam 2006 and winner of Miss Hai Duong 2006.

Miss World 2009
Hương Giang is the first Miss Vietnam to ever place among the top 12 finalists of Miss World Beach Beauty competition which took place at Zimbali Resort, Kwazulu-Natal, Durban, South Africa on November 25, 2009, and became first runner-up in the Miss World Top Model competition. At the Miss World 2009, she placed in the final Top 16.

References

Trần Thị Hương Giang Preparations for Miss World
Huong Giang comes in third at Miss Vietnam Global

External links

1987 births
Living people
Miss World 2009 delegates
Vietnamese female models
Vietnamese beauty pageant winners
People from Hải Dương province
21st-century Vietnamese women